Rose Hill Heights is a neighborhood east of the central business district of Downtown Columbus, Georgia, United States. The boundaries are generally acknowledged to be 20th Street the north, Warm Springs Road to the south, Woodruff Road to the west and Hamilton Road to the east.

References 

Columbus metropolitan area, Georgia
Neighborhoods in Columbus, Georgia